Qeshlaq-e Owch Quyi Ali Akbar (also Romanized as Qeshlāq-e Owch Qūyī ʿAlī Akbar) is a village in Qeshlaq-e Sharqi Rural District, Qeshlaq Dasht District, Bileh Savar County, Ardabil Province, Iran.

At the 2006 census, its population was 40, in 10 families.

References 

Towns and villages in Bileh Savar County